Russian cursive is a variant of the Russian alphabet used for writing by hand. It is the handwritten form of the modern Russian Cyrillic script, used instead of the block letters seen in printed material. In addition, Russian italics for lowercase letters are often based on Russian cursive (such as lowercase , which resembles Latin m). Most handwritten Russian, especially in personal letters and schoolwork, uses the cursive alphabet. In Russian schools most children are taught from first grade how to write with this script.

History 

The Russian (and Cyrillic in general) cursive was developed during the 18th century on the base of the earlier Cyrillic tachygraphic writing (skoropis, "rapid or running script", which in turn was the 14th–17th chancery hand of the earlier Cyrillic bookhand scripts (called ustav and poluustav). It became the handwritten counterpart of so-called "civil" (or Petrine) printed script of books. In order, modern Cyrillic italic typefaces are based (in their lowercase part) mostly on the cursive shape of the letters.

The resulting cursive bears many similarities with the Latin cursive. For example, the modern Russian cursive letters "" may coincide with Latin cursive "ABDEUKMHOPCYX abgezuonpcmyxr" (𝒜ℬ𝒟ℰ𝒰𝒦ℳℋ𝒪𝒫𝒞𝒴𝒳 𝒶𝒷ℊℯ𝓏𝓊ℴ𝓃𝓅𝒸𝓂𝓎𝓍𝓇), respectively (despite having completely different sound values in many cases); both upright and italic printed typefaces demonstrate less similarity.

One must not confuse the historical Russian chancery hand, the contemporary Russian cursive and the contemporary Russian stenography. The latter is completely different from the other two, though it is sometimes called  like the former.

Features 
Russian cursive is much like contemporary English and other Latin cursives. But unlike Latin handwriting, which can range from fully cursive to heavily resembling the printed typefaces and where idiosyncratic mixed systems are most common, it is standard practice to write Russian in Russian cursive almost exclusively.

There exists some ambiguity from the fact that several lowercase cursive letters consist (entirely or in part) of the element that is identical to the dotless Latin cursive letter ı, the cursive Greek letter ι or a half of the cursive letter u, namely . Therefore, certain combinations of these Russian letters cannot be unambiguously deciphered without knowing the language or without a broader context. The word , "you will deprive" written in cursive consists almost exclusively of these elements. There are examples of different words that become absolutely identical in their cursive form, e.g.

Also, writing  in its printed form (the T shape) rather than its usual m shape is common.

The letter  may also be written in the shape of ꝺ or ∂.

Several letters in Russian cursive are different from the cursive used in the Serbian and Macedonian languages. Thus, Serbian/Macedonian cursive lowercase г looks the same as in Russian with additional macron, п is written like the cursive Latin u with macron (ū), and the letter т is written in the shape of ɯ̅.

Difficulty 
Some words in Russian may pose a challenge due to the similarities between the letters Ш, Щ, И, Л, М in cursive.

Charts

See also 
 Cursive
 Russian alphabet
 Skoropis′

References

Cyrillic script
Penmanship
Russian language
Western calligraphy